Benjamin St-Juste (born September 8, 1997) is a Canadian gridiron football cornerback for the Washington Commanders of the National Football League (NFL). A native of Montreal, he moved to the United States to play college football at Michigan and Minnesota before being drafted by Washington in the third round of the 2021 NFL Draft.

Early life and college career
St-Juste was born on September 8, 1997, in Montreal, Canada, to a Haitian father and French-Canadian mother. He grew up speaking French and Haitian Creole before learning English at Cégep du Vieux Montréal. St-Juste played ice hockey as a youth, with his interest in American football being taken later after his father Wilbert, who was a member of the 1989 Miami Hurricanes football team but broke his leg in preseason camp.

St-Juste began attended various college football camps in the United States in the mid-2010s, and was offered a scholarship to play for the Michigan Wolverines under Jim Harbaugh. He played in 12 games for the Wolverines as a freshman in 2017, but redshirted as a sophomore the following year due to a hamstring injury. He graduated from Michigan in two years with a bachelor's degree in sports management and transferred to the University of Minnesota as a graduate student in 2019. St-Juste played in 18 games and had 59 tackles in two years for the Minnesota Golden Gophers before finishing his collegiate career. He was invited to the 2021 Senior Bowl, where he recorded a tackle.

Professional career

St-Juste was selected by the Washington Football Team in the third round (74th overall) of the 2021 NFL Draft. He was also selected by the Toronto Argonauts in the sixth round (52nd overall) of the 2021 CFL Draft shortly after. St-Juste signed his four-year rookie contract with Washington on May 13, 2021. He made his NFL debut in the opening game against the Los Angeles Chargers, where recorded four tackles but allowed six catches in a 20–16 loss. He was placed on injured reserve in December 2021 due to lingering issues from a concussion.

St-Juste moved from outside corner to the slot for the 2022 season. He was moved back to outside corner following the benching of William Jackson III in Week 5. With 35 seconds remaining in Thursday Night Football and the Chicago Bears on fourth and goal, St-Juste made a key stop pushing wide receiver Darnell Mooney, who caught the pass, out of the endzone before Mooney's feet landed on the field and sealed the Commanders' 12-7 victory. In Week 9 against the Minnesota Vikings, he deflected a touchdown pass attempt from Kirk Cousins which cornerback Danny Johnson intercepted. The following week's victory over the then undefeated Philadelphia Eagles, St-Juste forced wide receiver Quez Watkins, after catching a 50-yard pass, to fumble the ball allowing safety Darrick Forrest to recover it. On January 6, 2023, he was placed on injured reserve.

References

External links

Washington Commanders bio
Minnesota Golden Gophers bio
Michigan Wolverines bio

1997 births
American football cornerbacks
Black Canadian players of American football
Canadian expatriate American football people in the United States
Canadian sportspeople of Haitian descent
Francophone Quebec people
Gridiron football people from Quebec
Haitian Quebecers
Living people
Michigan Wolverines football players
Minnesota Golden Gophers football players
Sportspeople from Montreal
Washington Commanders players
Washington Football Team players